R332 road may refer to:
 R332 road (Ireland)
 R332 road (South Africa)